Vivekananda Setu (also called Willingdon Bridge and Bally Bridge) is a bridge over the Hooghly River in West Bengal, India. It links the city of Howrah, at Bally, to Kolkata, at Dakshineswar. Completed on 1931, it is a multispan truss bridge and was built to primarily to provide direct road and rail connectivity between the Calcutta Port and the major railhead at Howrah railway station on the West bank of the Hooghly River. The famous Dakshineswar Kali Temple is situated on the banks of the Hooghly River near the bridge. The bridge is one of the four bridges linking Howrah and Kolkata.

Naming
The bridge was originally named Willingdon Bridge after Viceroy of India, Freeman Freeman-Thomas, 1st Marquess of Willingdon. It was eventually renamed as Bally Bridge, before officially renamed as Vivekananda Setu.

Construction

The erection and caissoning of the bridge was done by the noted Kutchi-Mestri  railway contractor and industrialist Rai Bahadur Jagmal Raja. His nameplate can still be seen on each girder of the bridge. The construction of bridge started in year 1926 and was completed in year 1931. The fabrication of the bridge was done at works of Braithwaite & Company, Calcutta.

The viaduct consists of 22 spans of  girders built of masonry piers, whose foundations have been piled with reinforced concrete piles 40 to 50 feet long. The bridge itself consists of seven  main spans and two  land spans. The eight main piers in the river are founded on octagonal steel caissons, 70 feet by 37 feet, having two dredging holes each 19 feet in diameter. The caissons were all floated into position and founded by loading with concrete, sustaining the load on compressed air buoyancy and releasing the air on a suitable falling tide. The foundation was laid with well-sinking  down the river beds. Girding, erection of abutments and arching were all done by Rai Bahadur Jagmal Raja. This railway bridge is also important in the annals of history of railways in India because the railway for the first time crossed over River Hooghly and reached Calcutta at Sealdah Terminus thus connecting the East and West banks of the river.

The bridge was by far the most expensive and the most difficult of the railway bridges to be constructed in India up to that time. The bridge was constructed at a total cost of 

The first train that ran across the bridge was named Jagmal Raja Howrah Express by the British, acknowledging the feat of Rai Bahadur Jagmal Raja.

Usage

The bridge serves both road and rail:
 Rail - the railway line through the bridge forms a part of the Calcutta Chord link line which connects Sealdah Station with the Howrah–Bardhaman chord line and Howrah–Kharagpur line.
 Road - the bridge connects the Grand Trunk Road (Howrah side - West bank) with the Barrackpore Trunk Road (Kolkata side - East bank).

The bridge had become weak as a result of ageing, and with heavy traffic, even repairs became difficult. It was opened to traffic in 2007. Following this the Vivekananda Setu allows traffic movement for light vehicles, namely passenger vehicles, while the Nivedita Setu helps traffic movement of heavy vehicles, like trucks. While trucks and other heavy vehicles are not allowed on the Vivekananda Setu, two and three wheelers are not allowed on the toll bridge of Nivedita Setu.

See also
 Howrah Bridge
 Vidyasagar Setu
 Nivedita Setu

References

1930 establishments in India
Bridges completed in 1930
Bridges in West Bengal
Bridges in Kolkata
Bridges over the Ganges
Buildings and structures in Howrah
Railway bridges in India
Railway bridges in West Bengal
Tourist attractions in Howrah
20th-century architecture in India